"You've Made Me So Very Happy" is a song written by Brenda Holloway, Patrice Holloway, Frank Wilson and Berry Gordy, and was released first as a single in 1967 by Brenda Holloway on the Tamla label. The song was later a huge hit for jazz-rock band Blood, Sweat & Tears in 1969, and became a Gold record.

Overview

Brenda Holloway version
Brenda Holloway had been recording for Motown Records since 1964, and by 1967 had struggled with the label over control of and support for her music. As she was a Los Angeles resident with much of the rest of the Motown roster living near the label's Detroit, MI headquarters, Holloway felt overlooked and neglected during her five years on the label. In 1967, Holloway was hoping for the release of her long-awaited second album, Hurtin' & Cryin, with her latest single, "Just Look What You've Done," intended as the first single. For unknown reasons, the record was shelved.

"You've Made Me So Very Happy, " which became Holloway's final single on Motown's Tamla label, was co-written by Holloway with her sister, Patrice, producer Frank Wilson, and Motown label head Berry Gordy. Despite its optimism, the impetus for the song was a breakup Holloway was going through at the time. Holloway and Gordy argued over the song's arrangement during the recording process, a fight Holloway lost and a confrontation that underscored her decision to depart from the label afterward.

Reaction to the song was stronger than Holloway's previous offerings, rising to number 39 on the Billboard Hot 100 and becoming her third Top-40 pop single. It peaked at number 40 on the Billboard R&B singles chart. Shortly after its release, Holloway left Motown and the song was eventually featured on her "second" album, The Artistry of Brenda Holloway. After two years singing backgrounds for acts such as Joe Cocker, Holloway retired to marry a preacher and raise a family. By the mid-1990s, she had returned to music full-time.

Blood, Sweat & Tears version
Brenda Holloway's "You've Made Me So Very Happy" received a boost when the jazz-rock group Blood, Sweat & Tears recorded a new arrangement in 1969. Included on the group's eponymous second album, it became one of Blood, Sweat & Tears' biggest hits, reaching number 2 on the Billboard Hot 100 in the United States in April 1969. The song was kept from the number 1 spot by "Aquarius/Let the Sunshine In" by The 5th Dimension.  Outside the US, "You've Made Me So Very Happy", went to number 35 in the United Kingdom in May 1969.

Other versions
 The song was recorded by Motown acts such as Edwin Starr and Blinky on their 1969 duet album Just We Two, Chris Clark on her 1969 album CC Rides Again, The Temptations in 1970, The Miracles, also in 1970, and Diana Ross in 1994 on a Berry Gordy tribute album.
 Bobbie Gentry, on her 1969 album Touch 'Em with Love.
 Cher, in 1969, for her album 3614 Jackson Highway, but the take was left off the final track list.
 Lou Rawls recorded it and named his 18th album, You've Made Me So Very Happy (1970) after it.
 Sammy Davis Jr., for his 1970 album, Something for Everyone.
 Matt Monro, on his 1970 album We're Gonna Change the World.
 Little-known Motown act The Hearts of Stone recorded a version for their 1970 album Stop the World - We Wanna Get On.
 Alton Ellis cut two reggae versions in 1970, one for Treasure Isle and one for Studio One, both in Jamaica.
 Mina, on her 1972 live album Dalla Bussola.
 Shirley Bassey, on her 1976 album Love, Life and Feelings.
 In 1977, Barry Williams performed the song on an episode of The Brady Bunch Variety Hour (1976–1977).
 In 1994 it was sung by pop musician Gloria Estefan; she included the song on her album Hold Me, Thrill Me, Kiss Me, which was a collection of songs that inspired her musical career.
 In 2012, Julian Ovenden put it on his debut album If You Stay.

Chart history

Brenda Holloway version

Blood, Sweat & Tears version

Personnel

Brenda Holloway version
Lead vocals by Brenda Holloway
Background vocals by assorted vocalists
Instrumentation by bass: Carol Kaye, other unknown Los Angeles musicians
Produced by Frank Wilson and Berry Gordy Jr.

Blood, Sweat & Tears version
Lead vocals by David Clayton-Thomas
Background vocals by Bobby Colomby, Dick Halligan, Steve Katz, and other assorted vocalists
Instrumentation by Blood, Sweat & Tears (including)
Fred Lipsius – alto saxophone, piano
Lew Soloff – trumpet, flugelhorn
Chuck Winfield – trumpet, flugelhorn
Jerry Hyman – trombone, recorder
Dick Halligan – organ, piano, flute, trombone
Steve Katz – guitar, harmonica
Jim Fielder – bass
Bobby Colomby – drums, percussion
Produced by James William Guercio

References

External links
 Original version by Brenda Holloway at youtube.com
 Arrangement by Blood, Sweat & Tears at youtube.com
 List of versions of "You've Made Me So Very Happy" at SecondHandSongs.com

1967 singles
1969 singles
Columbia Records singles
Motown singles
Tamla Records singles
Brenda Holloway songs
Blood, Sweat & Tears songs
Songs written by Berry Gordy
Songs written by Frank Wilson (musician)
Song recordings produced by James William Guercio
Song recordings produced by Berry Gordy
1967 songs
Song recordings produced by Frank Wilson (musician)